Qingyang County is a county in the south of Anhui Province, People's Republic of China. It is the northeasternmost county-level division of the prefecture-level city of Chizhou. The government of Qingyang County is located in Rongcheng Town.
Qingyang county benefited in 1540 from Mao Kun(1512–1601)'s brief (2-month) tenure as magistrate.  He helped the coppersmiths of the area by shutting down illegal shops that were being run by people from outside the county, and mitigated the abuses of local bullies.  The county honored him with a shrine when he had to return home to mourn his father's death.

Administrative divisions
Qingyang County has jurisdiction over 8 towns and 3 townships.

Towns

- Former Towns
 Tongbu, Jiuhua, Wuqi, Shaji

Townships
 Qiaomu Township
 Youhua Township
 Ducun Township
- Former Townships
 Chengdong Township, Yangtian Township, Dongbao Township, Nanyang Township, Zhuyang Township (竹阳乡), Jiuhua Township

Climate

Transport
China National Highway 318

References

Chizhou
County-level divisions of Anhui